"Say 'uncle'!" is a chiefly North American expression demanding that the opponent in a contest submit. The response "Uncle!" is equivalent to "I give up!" or similar sentiment, and indicates submission.

Definition

In the United States and Canada, the idiomatic expression "Say 'uncle'!" may be used as an imperative command to demand submission of one's opponent, such as during an informal wrestling match or tickling.  Similarly, the exclamation "Uncle!" is an indication of submission—analogous to "I give up!"—or it may be a cry for mercy, in such a game or match.

Origin
There are several theories on the phrase's origin.

Due to heavy Irish immigration in eastern Canada and New England in the 19th century, it is likely an anglicization of the Irish 'anacal', meaning deliverance or quarter.

A less likely theory is that it derives from a phrase uttered by youngsters in the Roman empire who got into trouble,  (“uncle, my best of uncles”).

A fanciful suggestion is that it may be based on a joke from 19th-century England about a bullied parrot being coaxed to address his owner's uncle.

Another suggested origin is from the English phrase “time out”, a plea to cease hostilities. The abbreviated usage "T.O." was mistaken for the Spanish “tío”, which means "uncle".

Foreign-language analog
There is a common analog in the Arabian Peninsula, the expression "" ([q]uwl 'aamiy), which means "say uncle".

References

Further reading
 

American English idioms
Idioms